Giovanni Battista Gisleni (1600 – 3 May 1672) was an Italian Baroque architect, stage designer, theater director, singer, and musician at the Polish-Lithuanian royal court.

Gisleni was born and died in Rome. He served three Polish kings of the Vasa dynasty: Sigismund III, Władysław IV and John II Casimir, during the years 1630–1668. Gisleni's tomb in the church of Santa Maria del Popolo in Rome takes the form of a memento mori, showing an intricately carved skeleton figure of Death.

Main works 
 Biaroza monastery of the Carthusians in present-day Belarus (1648)
 Church of the Discalced Carmelite Nuns in Lviv (1642)
 Church of the Discalced Carmelites in Warsaw (1652)
 project of an altar for the Miraculous Icon of Black Madonna of Częstochowa, Jasna Góra in Częstochowa (circa 1630)
 Baroque Altar funded by bishop Piotr Gembicki in the Wawel Cathedral (circa 1650)

Publications 
 Varii disegni d'architettura inventati e delineati da Gio:Battista Gisleni Romano architetto delle MMta et Sermo Prencipe di Polonia e Sueta Sir John Soane's Museum, London – 116 mostly unrealized projects
 12 drawings. Milan, Castello Sforzesco.
 Architectural projects by Gisleni and other architects. Dresden, Kupferstichkab.; Skizzenbuch des G. Chiaveri.

References

Italian Baroque architects
1600 births
1672 deaths
Polish Baroque architects
Belarusian Baroque architects
Ukrainian Baroque architects